Cottage Gardens is a historic house in Natchez, Mississippi, USA.

History

The house was built for Don José Vidal in 1795. It was subsequently purchased by Earl Norman, a photographer. By 1963, it was purchased by William C. McGehee.

Architectural significance
It has been listed on the National Register of Historic Places since July 5, 1979.

References

Houses on the National Register of Historic Places in Mississippi
Federal architecture in Mississippi
Houses completed in 1795
Spanish Colonial architecture in the United States
Houses in Adams County, Mississippi